Narjja is a village in Bhatar CD block in Bardhaman Sadar North subdivision of Purba Bardhaman district in the state of West Bengal, India with total 301 families residing.

History
Census 2011 Narjja Village Location Code or Village Code 319810. The village of Narjja is located in the Bhatar tehsil of Burdwan district in West Bengal, India.

Transport 

Population 
Narjja village, most of the villagers are from Schedule Caste (SC) & Schedule Tribe (ST). Schedule Tribe (ST) constitutes 27.40% while Schedule Caste (SC) were 26.51% of total population in Narjja village.

Population and house data

Healthcare
Nearest Rural Hospital at Bhatar (with 60 beds) is the main medical facility in Bhatar CD block. There are primary health centers..

References 

Villages in Purba Bardhaman district